Luís Arias (born June 12, 1990) is an American professional boxer.

Amateur career
Arias was born in Milwaukee to a Nicaraguan mother and a Cuban father. He took up boxing at 8, at the United Community Center under Israel "Shorty" Acosta. He was the 2008 and 2010 U.S. national champion at middleweight. He's also won a gold medal at the National PAL Champion, an AIBA Youth World Championships bronze medal, and a silver medal at the National Golden Gloves. Arias finished his amateur career with an impressive record of 140–25.

Professional career
Arias is a promotional free agent, working most recently with Mayweather Promotions. Arias made his debut in November 2012, beating Josh Thorpe via unanimous decision in a four-round bout. In August 2016, Arias defeated Darryl Cunninham for the USBA middleweight title. Arias fought Arif Magomedov on the undercard of Ward-Kovalev II. Arias dropped Magomedov with a right hand in round 5. Magomedov got up, but after Arias landed another big shot, the referee stopped the contest to give Arias a TKO victory.

In 2017, Arias fought Daniel Jacobs on November 11 at the Nassau Coliseum. The fight served as one of the final main event boxing matches on HBO. Jacobs defeated Arias by unanimous decision. Per Nielsen Media Research, Jacobs-Arias was among the top 20 most watched premium cable fights in 2017. After the Jacobs fight, Arias and Roc Nation amicably parted ways. In 2018, Arias squared off against two-time world title challenger Gabriel Rosado live on DAZN and the two battled to a split draw.

After suffering a points loss to Luke Keeler in Belfast in 2019, Arias rebounded to secure his first win in almost 4 years, when he beat Jarrett Hurd by split decision on June 6, 2021, in Miami on the undercard of Floyd Mayweather Jr. vs. Logan Paul.

Professional boxing record

References

External links
 
 
 Profile

American boxers of Cuban descent
American boxers of Latin American descent
American people of Nicaraguan descent
Nicaraguan boxers
Winners of the United States Championship for amateur boxers
Sportspeople from Milwaukee
Middleweight boxers
1990 births
Living people
American male boxers